Niarovana Caroline is a small village and rural commune in the Vatomandry District, Atsinanana Region, Madagascar.

It is situated on the National Road 1RN 11a south of  Ilaka Est.

References

Populated places in Atsinanana